Joe Bearman (born 28 February 1982) is a rugby union player playing in Wales. A Number 8, he currently plays his club rugby for the Ospreys having previously played for the Newport Gwent Dragons and the Cornish Pirates.

Bearman joined the Dragons in 2005 from the Cornish Pirates and made a total of 77 appearances for the Dragons. Bearman was the Magners League Player of the Month in January 2008. After gaining Welsh qualification through residency in 2009, Bearman was in line for selection for the Welsh International Squad before a groin injury curtailed his season. A succession of injuries largely ruled him out of competitive rugby from Autumn 2009 until April 2011.

Bearman joined the coaching team of Cardiff University rugby club in the 21–22 season.

References

External links
Newport Gwent Dragons profile

1982 births
Living people
Cornish Pirates players
Cornish rugby union players
Dragons RFC players
Ospreys (rugby union) players
People from Newquay
Rugby union number eights